Chief of Staff of the Navy may refer to:

 Chief of Staff of the French Navy
 Chief of Staff of the Indonesian Navy
 Chief of Staff of the Italian Navy
 Chief of Staff of the Navy (Spain)
 Chief of Naval Operations
 Chief of the Royal Danish Navy

See also
 Chief of the Defence Staff (disambiguation)
 Chief of Navy (disambiguation)
 Chief of the Naval Staff (disambiguation)